United Airlines Flight 93 was a plane that was hijacked as part of the September 11, 2001, attacks and crashed in Stonycreek Township, near Shanksville, Pennsylvania. 

Flight 93 may also refer to:

Aircraft and flights
 Pan Am Flight 93, airplane involved in the Dawson's Field hijackings in September 1970

Locations
 Flight 93 National Memorial, National Park Service unit in Pennsylvania at the site of the crash of United Airlines Flight 93

Art, entertainment, and media
 Flight 93 (2006 film) (January 30, 2006), an A&E made-for-TV movie about United Airlines Flight 93, directed by Peter Markle
 I Missed Flight 93 (2006), a History Channel television documentary about those who missed United Airlines Flight 93
 United 93 (film), theatrical feature film about United Airlines Flight 93 directed by Paul Greengrass (formerly titled Flight 93)
 "Flight 093 Is Missing",  a season 2 episode of Airwolf
The Flight That Fought Back, 2005 docudrama film about United Airlines Flight 93

0093